Veronika Poláčková (sometimes as Veronika Poláček) is Czech actress.

Biography 
She was born 28 August 1982 in Prague.

Education 
After graduating from the Janáček Academy of Music and Performing Arts (JAMU) in Brno in 2004 she completed her doctoral program in Dramaturgy in 2012. Since 2006 Poláčková works as guest lecturer and pedagogical adviser at the JAMU in Brno.

Professional career 

 2004 – 2009 actress at the Brno City Theatre
 2009 – 2013 presenter and editor at the local Brno TV station ("BRNĚNSKÁ TELEVIZE")
 2012–present actress at the "Malého divadla komedie " "

Movies and TV shows (selection) 

 2014	Poslední z Aporveru 
 2013	Pionýři hororu (TV show)
 2012	Tady hlídám já (movie)
 2010	Cesty domů (TV show)
 2009	Dům U Zlatého úsvitu (TV movie)
 2003	Janek nad Janky (TV movie)

Theatre

City Theatre, Brno 
Slaměný klobouk .... Helena
The Chioggia Scuffles .... Orsetta
Death of Paul I .... Mrs. Volkova
Peklo .... Shade
Three Musketeers .... Nun/Maid of honour/Aunt
Twelfth Night, or What You Will .... Valentin
Henry VIII .... Anne Boleyn
Máj .... Hanka
Arcadia ... Thomasina Coverly
Romance for Bugle .... Village Woman
Maškaráda .... niece
Ginger and Fred .... Cover Girl in TV Commercial
Labyrint světa a ráj srdce .... 1st picture
Jak je důležité míti Filipa .... Gwendoline Fairfax
Odysseia .... Aphrodite
Ferdinand, kd´Este? .... ensemble
Kdyby tisíc klarinetů .... girl from boarding school
Oliver! .... Off-stage
Zahrada divů .... Skřet

External links 
City Theatre (Czech)

References 

Czech stage actresses
Living people
1982 births
Actresses from Prague